Heinrich von Melk was a German satirist of the twelfth century; of knightly birth and probably a lay brother in the convent of Melk, in present-day Lower Austria.

References

German Roman Catholics
12th-century German writers
German male writers
People from Melk